Meg Lee Chin is a Taiwanese-American singer, songwriter, audio and video producer, writer and art activist who lives in London, England.

She is known as an early pioneer of the home studio revolution and female-produced music.  As an early adopter of computer-based audio production, she built her own PC and created "Egg Studio" with a small mixing desk and audio interfaces. Her role in the movement toward DIY record production was first recognized when she appeared as the first home studio producer to be featured in the January 2000 Millennial issue of EQ Magazine which was the foremost high-end audio publication of its time. She also appeared in Tape Op Magazine. and Electronic Musician.

Early life
Meg Lee Chin was born on 16 March 1960 in Taipei, Taiwan, to a US Air Force electronics engineer and a Taiwanese mother. She worked as a sound engineer while studying experimental art and video production at San Francisco State University, forming her first band, Felix Natural, during the early 1980s. Chin went on to co-found the short-lived Teknofear with Lunachicks drummer Becky Wreck and Swans guitarist Joe Goldring; frustrated with American life, she spent the late 1980s living in London, and eventually formed the all-female band Crunch.

She has been recording since her college days in San Francisco, when she recorded Faith No More's first demo on her 4-track, which featured Courtney Love on vocals.

In 1990, her home-produced music video entitled "The Ocean" was featured on MTV Europe's regular rotation. It may have been the first MTV Europe music video to be home-produced in super8 and transferred to video on a budget of £200. When asked by the producer how she managed to create a £200 video which was in his opinion "better than Duran Duran's £200,000 videos", Chin simply replied, "I've got pretty good taste". The video was later featured in an Institute of Contemporary Arts festival of film shorts.

Pigface
She is perhaps best known for her work with the anarchic industrial supergroup Pigface, headed by Martin Atkins of Invisible Records. According to an article in the LA Times March 23, 1998 "If you're looking for star potential, singer Meg Lee Chin". Signed to Invisible for five years, she left the label in 2002. After appearing on Pigface's 1997 LP A New High in Low as well as its follow-up, Below the Belt, in 1999 she released the solo debut Piece and Love on ex-Public Image Ltd, Ministry and Killing Joke drummer Martin Atkins' Invisible Records label. Recorded in her Soho, London flat and released in September, "Piece and Love" achieved critical acclaim on the darkwave, industrial underground scene and was hot-tipped in Billboard (magazine) magazine's "Heatseaker" section. The album peaked at #60 on the CMJ Radio 200 in the U.S.

The track "Nutopia" paints an apocalyptic vision of the future as a twist on Allen Ginsberg's poem "Howl". Other tracks have appeared on Showtime's "Queer as Folk", Warner Bros. Records "Witchblade"  and "Sleeper Cell".
 
An album of remixes, titled Junkies and Snakes, was released the following year again on Invisible Records.

Chin contributed tracks for Underground, Inc. releases such as the 2004 release of What's the Word, Volume One, featuring Jello Biafra, Mike Ladd, among others. Other works include a remix album Junkies and Snakes, also released on Invisible, along with some remixed covers of Ministry, David Bowie and Dead Kennedys tracks.

Crunch 
In 1992, Crunch had the distinction of being the first British based band to perform in Ukraine after the small country's freedom from the former U.S.S.R.This was just after the Glasnost period of Mikhail Gorbachev and before Vladimir Putin took the reins of power as the president of Russia. The band performed in Kyiv at the Palace "Ukraine" Concert Hall during the "Miss Rock Europe 92" festival.  They also performed the infamous women's prison in Kharkiv, Ukraine. Crunch's spirited, anthemic hard rock songs seemed to resonate with the new found freedom of the Ukrainian public who became fascinated with the women from the west. They travelled by were interviewed in Moscow on Russian State TV and Pravda called them "The Rock Stars from the West".

At a large press conference, the band were interrogated over questions of geo-politics. They all wanted to know the bands opinions on world affairs. But to this Meg Lee Chin replied "We are simply musicians and do not pretend to have the answers to delicate and complex geopolitical questions. We'll leave these answers to huge male egos like Sting". This prompted smiles from the female members of the press who began to scribble with renewed vigour in their notebooks. After the tour the band gifted their Ukrainian and Russian hosts with a DAT tape of an album's worth of their music to be distributed throughout the USSR copyright free.

Gearslutz
In 2002 she built, developed and co-created Gearslutz. Gearslutz (now Gearspace) is the largest pro-audio producer and sound engineer's forum on the web. On the 18th June 2010 in the High Court of Justice#Chancery Division in London, England, Margaret O'Leary aka Meg Lee Chin won a claim against her former business partner Julian Standen. After three years where she battled for her right to co-ownership of the Gearslutz business, Judge Master Justice Briggs ruled in Chin's favor for claim #HC07C03181. The settlement amount was agreed out of court.

In 2021, Meg responded to a petition where a group of women made a request for a name change to the site due to accusations of sexism. Chin surprised the audio community by revealing that she actually built the site.  The name has since been changed to Gearspace.

In response to interest stemming from the name change controversy and in order to provide insight into the injustices of the legal system, Chin Lee Chin created the Gearwarz website.

Political Art 
Chin's work has become increasingly political. In 2014 she released an anti-war music video using Vietnam-era war footage. "I Can't Pull the Trigger" was produced by Chin in London, England.

Chin has released 5 homegrown music videos. True to her DIY underground ethic Meg produced, filmed, directed, and edited all videos and music. A highly controversial political video "England's Mask" was featured in a talk at the Tate Gallery in London where she appeared on a panel of artists speaking on the topic "Artists Explore Brexit".

In 2019, she created a political documentary/cartoon entitled "England's Mask" which expands upon the song of the same name. The video demonstrates why Britain is in danger of losing its status as global creative leaders in street art, fashion and pop music. Solutions include an unconditional basic income, land tax, legal reform. Chin proposes the democratization of money printing by transferring money printing powers powers away from central banks.  The film screened at the Bookery Art Gallery in London on June 16, 2022. The event was called "Hack the Economy" and offered the public an invitation to talk, debate and brainstorm the future. An interview Q&A and discussion was hosted afterwards by art curator Manick Govinda.  

Chin created a genre called "Word Drops" which are short spoken word and commentary pieces, often of a political nature and mixed with an assortment of beats and sound effects. 

In 2021, she released five standalone singles through Distrokid.

Personal life
Chin currently lives in London, England.  She blogs regularly and has also written articles for Country Squire magazine in the UK. After the UK's 2016 referendum to leave the EU Meg formed the "Brexit Creatives" along with The Football Factory novelist John King independent arts consultant Manick Govinda, Arts and Society Forum convener Dr. Wendy Earle. On March 29. 2019 Chin appeared as a panelist on a "Uniqlo Tate Lates" discussion at London's Tate Gallery along with three other London artists. The discussion entitled "Artists Explore Brexit" and was to explore contemporary European identity in the work of the panelists.

Discography

Albums
Piece and Love (1999)
Junkies and Snakes (2000)

EPs and singles
Altered States of Amerika (2020)

Music videos
Tracklist:
Venus (in Brown Sheets) 
Celebrity Saviour 
I Can't Pull the Trigger 
England's Mask 
Bowies Heroes - A Tribute 
Crunch "Burning Down the Walls"at the Palace Ukraine

Political documentary/parody
Tracklist:
England's Mask - the Full Documentary 
Wish You Were Here - Free Julian Assange London Rally w/ Pink Floyd's Roger Waters 
Anna Soubry and the Parliamentary Backtracker's Rap

Word drops
Tracklist:
The United States of Europe featuring The Football Factory author John King
Hastings featuring poet Salena Godden
Trojan Horse

References

External links
 Official website

Living people
Pigface members
Underground, Inc. artists
1960 births
Taiwanese emigrants to the United States
Taiwanese people of American descent
American people of Taiwanese descent
American expatriates in England